Puyol is a Catalan surname and a variant of Pujol, meaning "hill". Notable people with the surname include:

Carles Puyol (born 1978), Spanish footballer
Pablo Puyol (born 1975), Spanish actor, dancer and singer

See also
Pujol (disambiguation)

Catalan-language surnames